This page details the fixtures, results and statistics between the Wellington Phoenix and their A-League opposition (from A to M) since the Phoenix joined the competition in the 2007–08 season.

For results and statistics for opposition from N to Z, see Wellington Phoenix FC results by opposition (N-Z).

All-time A-League results
Includes finals results; does not include pre-season matches or FFA Cup matches.

Overall record

Home/away record

All-time opposition goal scorers
Goals scored against the Wellington Phoenix.Excludes pre-season matches.

Adelaide United

Statistics

Results summary

Leading goal scorers

Discipline

Matches

Brisbane Roar

Statistics

Results summary

Leading goal scorers

Discipline

Matches

Central Coast Mariners

Statistics

Results summary

Leading goal scorers

Discipline

Matches

Gold Coast United

Statistics

Results summary

Leading goal scorers

Discipline

Matches

Melbourne City
At the conclusion of the 2013/14 season, Melbourne Heart was re-branded to Melbourne City and changed their colours from red and white to blue and white.

Statistics

Results summary

Leading goal scorers

Discipline

Matches

Melbourne Victory

Statistics

Results summary

Leading goal scorers

Discipline

Matches

References

External links

results